Hong Zicheng was a Chinese philosopher who lived during the end of the Ming dynasty.

Zicheng (自誠) was Hong's zi (字, 'courtesy name'); his given name was Hong Yingming (Hung Ying-ming, 洪應明), and his hao (號, 'pseudonym') was Huanchu Daoren (Huan-ch'u Tao-jen, 還初道人, 'Daoist Adept who Returns to the Origin').

Hong Zicheng wrote the Caigentan, the Xianfo qizong, and several no-longer extant books. The  Caigentan (菜根譚, 'Vegetable Roots Discourse') is an eclectic compilation of philosophical aphorisms that combine elements from Confucianism, Daoism, and Chan Buddhism. The 1602 Xianfo qizong (仙佛奇蹤, 'Marvelous Traces of Transcendents and Buddhas') contains legends about Daoist and Buddhist masters. The Qing dynasty catalog to the Siku Quanshu summarizes the Xianfo qizong:

Hong is a historically enigmatic figure. "Nothing is known about his life and career", write Goodrich and Fang (1976:678), except that he was a contemporary of Yu Kongqian (于孔兼), both of whom flourished during the Wanli Emperor's reign (1572–1620). Yu Kongjian was a high-ranking scholar-bureaucrat in Wanli's administration, but he resigned in 1588 after involvement in a controversy, returned to his birthplace in Jintan (Jiangsu Province), and devoted himself to writing and teaching, including lectures at the Donglin Academy. Yu's preface to the Caigentan provides the only early information about Hong Zicheng's life.

"We glean from this work that Hong might have suffered, like his friend Yu Kongjian," say Aitken and Kwok (2006:173), "a disappointing departure from official life joining the increasing ranks of recluses in the towns and lake areas of the lower Yangzi River region."

Modern research (Lo 2002:136) suggests that Hong might have been a native of Xindu District of Chengdu (Sichuan Province).

References
Aitken, Robert and D. W. Y. Kwok (2006). Vegetable Roots Discourse: Wisdom from Ming China on Life and Living: Caigentan. .
Chao Tze-Chiang. 2006. Epigrams from the Ming Dynasty. Discourses on Vegetable Roots. Kessinger Publishing.
Goodrich, L. Arrington and Fang Chaoying. 1976.  Dictionary of Ming biography, 1368-1644. Columbia University Press.
Lo Yuet Keung 劳悦强. 2002. "Cong Caigentan kan moshi de xinling neizhuan 从《菜根譚》看末世的心灵内转 [Viewing End-of-era Spiritual Change in the Caigentan]," Yazhou wenhua 亚洲文化 [Asian Culture], 26:136-153. 
Röser, Sabine: Die Aphorismensammlung T'sai-ken t'an: Hung Ying-mings Werk als Spiegel seiner Zeit, der Wan-li Ära der späten Ming-Zeit. PhD dissertation, Würzburg, 1987.
Vos, Frits. 1993. "The Ts'ai-ken T'an in Japan," in Conflict and Accommodation in Early Modern East Asia, ed. by Leonard Blussé and Harriet Thelma, 169–188. Brill.

17th-century Chinese philosophers
Ming dynasty philosophers
16th-century Chinese philosophers